The title of Prince of Tver was borne by the head of the branch of the Rurikid dynasty that ruled the Principality of Tver. In 1247 Tver was allocated to Grand Prince Alexander Nevsky, and became an independent principality. In 1252, the principality passed to his brother Yaroslav, who became the ancestor of the Tver dynasty of princes.

List of Princes of Tver

In 1485, Ivan III conquered Tver, and until 1490, his son Ivan the Young governed the duchy.

See also

 List of Russian rulers
 Rulers of Kievan Rus'

Further reading
 Bibliography of the history of the Early Slavs and Rus'
 Bibliography of Russian history (1223–1613)
 List of Slavic studies journals

External links
 Borzakovskiy Vladimir Stepanovich. (1876) (in Russian). History of the Prince of Tver (История Тверского княжества) at Runivers.ru in DjVu and PDF formats
 Grand Duchy of Tver

Tver
Tver
 
Rurikids